"Save the Last Dance for Me" is a song first popularized by The Drifters in 1960.

Save the Last Dance for Me may also refer to:

Save the Last Dance for Me (album) (1987), by Ben E. King
Save the Last Dance for Me (TV series), 2004 South Korean drama
Save The Last Dance For Me (musical), a 2012 musical
"Save the Last Dance for Me" (1986), an episode of Cheers

See also
Save the Last Dance, a 2001 film
"Save the Last Dance" (Union J song), 2013
"Save The Last Dance" , a 2014 song by Anton Ewald
"Save the Last Dance" (That's So Raven), a season 3 episode of That's So Raven
Last Dance (disambiguation)